Dera Baba Murad Shah is a Sufiyana Darbar located in Nakodar, Jalandhar Punjab, India. The Darbar is a symbol of love and peace where people from all different castes and religions come and pay their respects at this Darbar. The two main Darbars in Nakodar are Baba Murad Shah Darbar and Lal Badshah.

Description
It is a Sufi paradise located in Jalandhar District in Nakodar and is only 24 km away from Jalandhar City and 16 km from Kala Sanghian 114 km away from Amritsar . This pilgrimage site is a Sufi paradise which is very peaceful. The tomb is built in a structural way and photographs of Baba Murad Shah are displayed at a couple of places which look beautiful. The shrine of Baba Murad Shah after the death of Sai Laddi Shah was offered to the famous Punjabi singer, Gurdas Maan who has remained as a sewadaar. Various singers perform at this powerful place and also there is a mela (fair) celebrated regularly in Memory of Baba Murad Shah and Sai Ghulam (Laddi) Shah.

Gurdas Maan is an ardent follower of Sai Laddi Shah and also a frequent visitor. Sai ji loved Gurdas Maan very much. 
Thursdays are the most crowded day to visit this place as more than a thousand devotees visit this place on Thursdays. This is because Thursdays are regarded as special days within Sufism.

History
Baba Murad Shah became a disciple of Baba Shere Shah. He opted Fakeeri at the age of 24 years and returned to God at the age of 28 years. Baba Shere Shah always used to stay in lonely place and did not want people to come near him so that there would be no disturbance in his prayers. He used to be in prayers and read a book "Heer" written by Waris Shah. During the partition of India Baba Shere Shah moved to Pakistan and gave his blessing to Baba Murad Shah to look after the Darbar and to continue to spread the message of Sufism.

Sai Ghulam Shah also known as Sai Laddi Shah became the head of the darbar after Baba Murad Shah left this world. Sai ji continued to look after the darbar and continue building the darbar. Sai ji used to organize an annual Urs mela (fair) in the memory of Baba Murad Shah, which he invited Qawwal's and Sufi Punjabi Singers to perform. Qaramat Ali Qawwal group performed quite frequently and still do to this day. One of the Qawwalis that Sai Ji used to love was 'Mere Likhle Ghulama Vich Naa' which in every mehfil Sai ji would always listen to it. Sai Laddi Shah departed this world on Thursday the first of May 2008.

Gurdas Maan became a disciple of Sai ji and Sai ji loved Gurdas Maan very dearly. In 2006, Sai took his pagri (turban) off during a qawwali mehfil and placed it on Gurdas Maan's head.

After Sai Laddi Shah left this world, Gurdas Maan now leads the melas (fairs) in memory of Sai Laddi Shah and Baba Murad Shah.

Dera information

Every year two Urs melas (anniversary fair) are held, one in the memory of Baba Murad Shah and the other for Sai Laddi Shah. Gurdas Maan leads these auspicious events by visiting the grave of Baba Murad Shah and Sai Laddi Shah by offering prayers. He also conducts the Jhanda Rasm (Flag Ceremony) in which the green flag is replaced which symbolizes Sufism.

During the Urs (Anniversary) of Sai, Gurdas Maan usually offers gifts to the Mazars (tombs) of the pious Saints . He also lights incense sticks which has a great significance in Sufi rituals.

References

Sufi shrines in India
Jalandhar district
Sufism in Punjab, India
Religious buildings and structures in Punjab, India
1960 establishments in East Punjab
Religious buildings and structures completed in 1960
20th-century architecture in India